The Commander (knife) is a large recurve folding knife made by Emerson Knives, Inc. that was based on a custom design, the ES1-M, by Ernest Emerson that he originally built for a West Coast Navy SEAL Team.  It was winner of the Blade Magazine Overall Knife of the Year Award for 1999.

History
The Commander has its origins with Emerson's CQC-8 or "Banana" folding fighting knife based on the Bob Taylor Warrior Knife and the Bill Moran ST-23: a knife designed with the blade in line for reverse grip or sabre grip fighting.  This knife became popular among the British SAS and the US Navy SEALs, however the SEALs wanted something more aggressive so Emerson developed the SSRT(Silent Sentry Removal tool) model: a larger, hooked blade with a serrated, doubled-edged spine.  This blade's profile resembled the horn of a Rhinoceros and its more popular name is the Rhino.  The blade folded below the level of the handle scales so the user could not be cut by this extra edge, a small hole drilled through both handle scales and liners allowed the blade to be held in place so it would not open on a parachute jump and cause harm to the operator.  Although the knife functioned perfectly in the field, its final design was too specific for the Navy.

During this same period, Emerson was working on a SERE (Survival, Escape, Resistance, and Evasion) folding knife for troops at Fort Bragg. When officers from Naval Special Warfare saw this knife they felt that with a few small changes such as the addition of a blade-catcher, it would suit their needs: the final result was dubbed the ES1-M.  A civilian version was made and called the ES1-C; this model did not include the blade-catcher.

In field-testing it was realized that the blade-catcher would open the knife when drawn from the pocket.  Emerson modified this design and secured a patent for it in March 1999.  This mechanism is known as the Wave and the knife was added to the production line of Emerson's new factory and was called "The Commander".   The Commander was the winner of the Blade Magazine Overall Knife of the Year Award for 1999.

The Emerson Commander was the third model manufactured by Emerson Knives, Inc.  The earliest run in 1998 is one of the most sought-after production models by collectors, as the majority of the work from waterjet cutting the liners to grinding the blades was performed by hand, by Emerson himself.  In 2000, Emerson Knives offered a larger version based on the original size of the ES1-M and called it the "Super Commander" as well as a 10% downsized version dubbed the "Mini Commander".  The first runs of Super Commanders were made as limited editions for Triple Aught Design (TAD) Gear of San Francisco and featured the company's logo on the reverse side of the blade.  In 2005 the Super Commander became a regular model in the company's lineup.

In 2006, Emerson released a Commander with a larger clip-point blade and no recurve.  This model was specifically made for the hunting market as a skinning knife.  Its designation is the CQC-16.  In 2009, at the annual Blade Show in Atlanta, Georgia, Emerson announced a collaboration with Kershaw Knives to manufacture an automatic version of the Commander.  At the 2010 SHOT Show in Las Vegas, NV, Emerson unveiled the UBR Commander, a 10% scaled-up version of the Super Commander.

Specifications

The Commander features a recurve shaped blade that is 3.75" long and hardened to a Rockwell hardness of 57-59 RC.  The handle is 5.0" long making the knife 8.75" inches in length when opened.  The blade steel is Crucible's 154 CM and is .125" thick, although CPM S30V steel, ATS-34, Damascus steel, and Titanium with a carbide edge have been used.  The butt-end of the knife features a hole for tying a lanyard.  Some models are made with partially serrated blades to aid in the cutting of seatbelts or webbing.

The handle material of the Commander is composed of two titanium liners utilizing a Walker linerlock and a double detent as the locking mechanism.  The reasons for using titanium as a linerlock material were due to its exceptional strength-to-weight ratio and corrosion resistance.  The handle's scales are made from black G-10 Fiberglass, although models were made for a few years utilizing green G-10 and limited runs have been made with a desert tan color.  A pocket clip held in place by three screws allows the knife to be clipped to a pocket, web-gear, or MOLLE.

Each model is equipped with Emerson's Wave opening mechanism, aside from one-off versions that lacked it.  The Wave is a small hook on the spine of the blade designed to catch the edge of a user's pocket.  The blade opens as the knife is drawn.

The Mini Commander is built to the same specifications except the blade is 3.4" in length and 8.0" overall.  Likewise, the Super Commander has a 4.0" blade and is 9.5" in overall length.

In the media
The Commander was featured in the short-lived UPN television series Soldier of Fortune, Inc. and was used by the character of Zak in the 1998 movie The Placebo Effect.  The knife is written about in the military and spy novels of Dennis Chalker and Marcus Wynne and Barry Eisler's John Rain.

References

External links
Emerson Knives Official Site
Patent for the WAVE

Military knives
Equipment of the United States Navy
Pocket knives
Mechanical hand tools
Goods manufactured in the United States